Jean-Pierre Dubey (born 11 January 1951) is a Swiss former breaststroke swimmer. He competed in two events at the 1972 Summer Olympics.

References

External links
 

1951 births
Living people
Swiss male breaststroke swimmers
Olympic swimmers of Switzerland
Swimmers at the 1972 Summer Olympics
Place of birth missing (living people)
20th-century Swiss people